Lovetune for Vacuum is the debut album by Austrian musical project Soap&Skin, released in 2009 on PIAS Recordings. It is listed as #38 on musicOMH's Top 50 Albums of 2009.

In 2012 it was awarded a silver certification from the Independent Music Companies Association, which indicated sales of at least 20,000 copies throughout Europe.

Track listing

"Sleep" - 2:44
"Cry Wolf" - 3:48
"Thanatos" - 2:34
"Im Dorfe" - 3:42 †
"Extinguish Me" - 2:38
"Turbine Womb" - 3:46
"Cynthia" - 2:57
"Fall Foliage" - 2:44
"Spiracle" - 2:50
"Mr. Gaunt Pt 1000" - 2:27
"Marche Funèbre" - 2:59
"The Sun" - 3:14
"Fleischwolf" - 2:15 †
"DDMMYYYY" - 3:38
"Brother of Sleep" - 5:25

† indicates a track exclusive to the American edition of the album.

References

External links
 Soap&Skin official website
 Lovetune for Vacuum at discogs.com

2009 debut albums
Soap&Skin albums
European Border Breakers Award-winning albums